Dennis "Doc" Littky is the co-founder and co-director of The Big Picture Company, The Met School and College Unbound, and a former principal of Thayer High School in Winchester, New Hampshire. He was the subject of the 1992 NBC film A Town Torn Apart and the 1989 book Teacher: Dennis Littky's Fight for a Better School by Susan Kammeraad-Campbell, on which the film was based. He was portrayed in the film by Michael Tucker.

In 2003, Littky received the Harold W. McGraw, Jr. Prize in Education. The following year, he was ranked fourth on Fast Company's Top 50 Innovators. In 2005, his book The Big Picture: Education Is Everyone's Business won an Association of Educational Publishers award for nonfiction.

Further reading
Doc: The Story of Dennis Littky and His Fight for a Better School. Susan Kammeraad-Campbell (2005). Association for Supervision and Curriculum Development.

References

Living people
Educators from New Hampshire
People from Winchester, New Hampshire
Year of birth missing (living people)
20th-century American educators
21st-century American educators